Catch Up or similar terms may refer to:

Television
 Catch Up, a 1978–1979 Canadian children's television series
 Catch-up television, viewing past programmes via Internet television
 The Catch-Up, talk show on Australian daytime TV

Other
 Ketchup (the sauce), originally spelled 'catchup'
 The catch-up effect, hypothesis that poorer countries' incomes will grow faster than rich countries'